Yaron Hochenboim is a former Israeli footballer who now works as the general manager of Maccabi Bnei Reineh.

Honours
Liga Artzit
Runner-up (1): 2001-02
 Liga Leumit
Runner-up (1): 2008-09
Liga Alef (North)
Winner (1): 2012-13

References

1971 births
Living people
Israeli Jews
Israeli footballers
Beitar Haifa F.C. players
Beitar Nahariya F.C. players
Maccabi Kafr Qara F.C. players
Israeli football managers
Hapoel Hadera F.C. managers
Hapoel Nof HaGalil F.C. managers
Hapoel Beit She'an F.C. managers
Hapoel Ramat Gan F.C. managers
Hapoel Ashkelon F.C. managers
Hapoel Acre F.C. managers
Hapoel Afula F.C. managers
Maccabi Sha'arayim F.C. managers
Hapoel Petah Tikva F.C. managers
Hapoel Nir Ramat HaSharon F.C. managers
Hapoel Kfar Saba F.C. managers
Footballers from Haifa
Association footballers not categorized by position